Ahi Evran University is a university located in Kirşehir, Turkey. It was established in 2006.

References

External links
Official Website

Universities and colleges in Turkey
2006 establishments in Turkey
State universities and colleges in Turkey
Educational institutions established in 2006
Kırşehir Province